Mario is an American R&B and pop singer-songwriter, dancer, actor and model. Mario has released four studio albums. Teen-age R&B newcomer, Mario Barrett was born in Maryland, at the age of 15, Mario debuted with the release of "Just a Friend 2002", produced by Warryn Campbell and based on rapper Biz Markie's hit "Just a Friend". His self-titled album followed in July, featuring contributions by Grammy-winning Alicia Keys, the album went gold on RIAA. Turning Point, released in 2004, went to number two on the R&B album chart, hoisted by the ubiquitous smash hit "Let Me Love You", the single had so much success that gave to Mario all the winning awards of music, that he has, the CD Single was certificated Platinum in U.S. and in Australia, Turning Point was certificated Platinum in the U.S., the follow singles hadn't so much success has the first one, these are: How Could You, Here I Go Again and Boom featuring Juvenile (rapper). The December 2007 release of Mario's third album, Go, was preceded by several delays and projected release dates; its initial date was November of the previous year, it features the singles How Do I Breathe and the Top five hit Crying out for Me, which was certificated Gold by the Recording Industry Association of America (RIAA). D.N.A., Mario's fourth album, was released in October 2009. At the time, two of its songs, "Break Up" which served as the lead single, and was number one for seven consecutive weeks on Billboard Mainstream R&B/Hip-Hop chart, with help from Gucci Mane and Sean Garrett and was also certificated Gold by the Recording Industry Association of America (RIAA), as a ringtone. "Thinkin' About You," was released as the second single, were already on the singles charts.

In 2004 Mario at the Vibe Awards "Let Me Love You" was nominated for Best R&B Song, at the Teen Choice Awards "Let Me love You" was nominated twice, the first was Choice Love Song and the second Choice R&B/Rap Track, but didn't receive any award. In 2005 has received several nominations at the Billboard Music Awards; among these are Hot 100 Single of the Year and Hot 100 Singles Track of the Year (Airplay) for "Let Me Love You", "Hot 100 Artist of the Year – Male", he also received four nominations for "Hot R&B/Hip-Hop Single of the Year", "Hot R&B/Hip-Hop Single of the Year (Airplay)", "Top R&B/Hip-Hop Single of the Year", "Top R&B/Hip-Hop Single of the Year (Airplay)" which has won all with the breakthrough hit single "Let Me Love You"; nominated also for Best R&B Single at the MTV Europe Music Awards, for Best Male Artist R&B and Viewer's Choice for "Let Me Love You" at the BET Awards and Best Single "Let Me Love You" at the MOBO Awards also nominated at the Soul Train Music Awards for Best R&B/Soul with "Let Me Love You". In 2006, at the Grammy Awards has been nominated in the category of Best Contemporary R&B Album with "Turning Point" and Best Male R&B Vocal Performance with "Let Me Love You", at MTV Australia Awards the music video for "Let Me Love You" has been nominated for Best R&B Video. In 2008 "I Won't Love You to Death: The Story of Mario and His Mom" was nominated for the category of "Television: Teen Program" at the Prism Awards which won. In 2009, the music nominations returned so far "Break Up", which features Gucci Mane and Sean Garrett, was nominated for Best Collaboration at the Soul Train Music Awards, In 2010 he was nominated for "Favorite Male Singer" at the Teen Choice Awards. Overall, Mario has received 5 awards from 21 nominations.

BET Awards
The BET Awards were established in 2001 by the Black Entertainment Television (BET) network to celebrate African Americans and other minorities in music, acting, sports, and other fields of entertainment. Mario has received two nominations.

|-
|rowspan="2"|2005
|rowspan="1"|Mario
|Best Male Artist – R&B
|
|-
|"Let Me Love You"
|Viewer's Choice
|
|-

Billboard Music Awards
The Billboard Music Awards are sponsored by Billboard magazine and is held annually in December. The awards are based on sales data by Nielsen SoundScan and radio information by Nielsen Broadcast Data Systems. Mario has received two awards from five nominations.

|-
|rowspan="5"|2005
|rowspan="1"|Mario
|Hot 100 Artist of the Year – Male
|
|-
|"Let Me Love You"
|Hot 100 Single of the Year
|
|-
|"Let Me Love You"
|Hot 100 Singles Track of the Year (Airplay)
|
|-
|"Let Me Love You"
|Hot R&B/Hip—Hop Single of the Year
|
|-
|"Let Me Love You"
|Hot R&B/Hip—Hop Single of the Year (Airplay)
|

Billboard R&B/Hip-Hop Awards
The Billboard R&B/Hip-Hop Awards reflect the performance of recordings on the Hot R&B/Hip-Hop Songs and Hot Rap Tracks. Mario has received two awards from two nominations.

|-
|rowspan="2"|2005
|"Let Me Love You"
|Top R&B/Hip—Hop Single of the Year
|
|-
|"Let Me Love You"
|Top R&B/Hip—Hop Single of the Year (Airplay)
|

Grammy Awards
The Grammy Awards are awarded annually by the National Academy of Recording Arts and Sciences. Mario has received two nominations.

|-
|rowspan="2"|2006
|rowspan="1"|"Turning Point"
|Best Contemporary R&B Album
|
|-
|rowspan="1"|"Let Me Love You"
|Best Male R&B Vocal Performance
|

MOBO Awards
The MOBO Awards (an acronym for "Music of Black Origin") were established in 1996 by Kanya King. They are held annually in the United Kingdom to recognize artists of any race or nationality performing music of black origin. Mario has received 1 nomination.

|-
|2005
|Let Me Love You
|Best Single
|

MTV Video Music Awards
The MTV Video Music Awards were established in the end of the summer of 1984 by MTV to celebrate the top music videos of the year. Mario has received two nominations in two different categories.

MTV Australia Awards
The MTV Australia Awards started in 2005 and is Australia's first awards show to celebrate both local and international acts. Mario has received one nomination.

|-
|2006
|"Let Me Love You"
|Best R&B Video
|

MTV Europe Music Awards
The MTV Europe Music Awards were established in 1994 by MTV Europe to celebrate the most popular music videos in Europe. Mario has received one nomination.

|-
|2005
|"Let Me Love You"
|Best R&B Single
|

Prism Awards
The Prism Awards concentrate on drug, alcohol and tobacco issues. Mario has received one award from one nomination.

|-
|2008
|I Won't Love You to Death: The Story of Mario and His Mom
|Television: Teen Program
|

Soul Train Music Awards
The Soul Train Music Awards is an annual award show aired in national broadcast syndication that honors the best in African American music and entertainment established in 1987. Mario has received two nominations.

|-
|2005
|"Let Me Love You"
|Best R&B/Soul Single
|
|-
|2009
|"Break Up" (with Gucci Mane and Sean Garrett)
|Best Collaboration
|

Teen Choice Awards
The Teen Choice Awards were established in 1999 to honor the year's biggest achievements in music, movies, sports and television, as voted for by young people aged between 13 and 19. Mario has received three nominations

|-
|rowspan="2"|2004
|"Let Me Love You"
|Choice Love Song
|
|-
|"Let Me Love You"
|Choice R&B/Rap Track
|
|-
|rowspan="1"|2010
|"Mario"
|Favorite Male Singer
|

Vibe Awards
The Vibe Awards were established in 2003, the magazine has put on its annual award show, held on UPN. Mario has received one nomination.

|-
|2004
|"Let Me Love You"
|Best R&B Song
|

References

Mario